Sir Cecil James Juxon Talbot Barton   (13 April 1891 – 29 September 1980) known as Sir Juxon Barton,  was a British colonial administrator who twice served as Governor of Fiji and High Commissioner for the Western Pacific.  His first term in both roles ran from May to November 1936, and his second from August to September 1938.

Born in Ross-on-Wye, he was the eldest child of Robert Cecil Eustace Barton and Amy Isabella Barton.

Perhaps his best-known quote is: "Be daring, be different, be impractical, be anything that will assert integrity of purpose and imaginative vision against the play-it-safers, the creatures of the commonplace, the slaves of the ordinary."

References

|-

|-

1891 births
1980 deaths
Governors of Fiji
High Commissioners for the Western Pacific
Members of the Legislative Council of Fiji
Knights Bachelor
Companions of the Order of St Michael and St George
Officers of the Order of the British Empire
British people in British Fiji